Dyce Football Club (formerly  Dyce Juniors Football Club) are a Scottish football club from Dyce, a suburb of Aberdeen. Members of the Scottish Junior Football Association, they currently play in the SJFA North Superleague. The club are based at Ian Mair Park and their colours are blue and white hoops.

History
Dyce Juniors were established in 1989 following the amalgamation of two existing sides, Mugiemoss F.C. (founded 1887) and Rosslyn Sport F.C. (founded 1923 as Rosemount). The merger was spurred by problems both clubs faced concerning their home grounds. The Linksfield Stadium facility in Aberdeen, which Mugiemoss shared with two other sides, Lewis United and Parkvale, was due to undergo redevelopment, reducing the number of pitches available. Rosslyn Sport were struggling to maintain their own Rosslyn Park ground in Dyce. With both sides wishing to retain their own name, a compromise of Dyce Juniors was chosen and the club set up at Rosslyn Park. Within one season, disagreements at committee level led to the resignation of the previous Rosslyn Sport officials, leaving the club as essentially Mugiemoss F.C. playing under the Dyce Juniors banner. The Dyce
club colours are blue and white hoops, but have retained the Mugiemoss tradition by using their black and white stripes as the change kit. The Rosslyn Park ground continued to prove troublesome, requiring new dressing rooms to be constructed and in 2000 the stadium was renamed Ian Mair Park in memory of a club official who died.

The team have been managed since December 2018 by Allan Youngson and Ritchie Clark.

Honours

 North (Norsco) Regional Cup: 2007–08, 2008–09
 North Region Grill League Cup: 2008–09, 2015–16, 2017–18
 North Region Division One Champions: 2005–06
 Morrison Trophy: 2001–02

Rosslyn Sport reached the semi-finals of the Scottish Junior Cup in 1964–65 as Rosemount.

References

External links
 Club website

 
Football clubs in Aberdeen
Football clubs in Scotland
Scottish Junior Football Association clubs
Association football clubs established in 1989
1989 establishments in Scotland